Wrapped Tight is an album by the American jazz saxophonist Coleman Hawkins of performances recorded in 1965 for the Impulse! label.

Reception

In his review at AllMusic, Scott Yanow gave the album 4 stars, writing, "Hawkins's last strong recording finds the veteran, 43 years after his recording debut with Mamie Smith's Jazz Hounds, improvising creatively on a wide variety of material... [showing] that the tenor-saxophonist was still coming up with new ideas in 1965."  

A reviewer for Billboard commented: "Manny Albam's arrangements guide the larger group with swinging style and grace. 'Beautiful Girl' and 'She's Fit' are particularly outstanding."

Writing for Life, Carter Harman called the album "another anthology of wonderful standards," and noted that it "proves that the tenorman, in his 40th year of fame, can still compete favorably with the younger crowd on their own terms."

A writer for Negro Digest stated that the album "drives home a lesson sorely needed in the often cultist world of jazz: that genuine artistry is a thing of its itself, transcending the superficialities of form, style and vogue."

Track listing
 "Marcheta" (Victor Schertzinger) – 3:06
 "Intermezzo" (Pietro Mascagni) – 3:37
 "Wrapped Tight" (Manny Albam) – 3:30
 "Red Roses for a Blue Lady" (Sid Tepper, Roy C. Bennett) – 2:25
 "She's Fit" (Coleman Hawkins) – 2:45
 "Beautiful Girl" (Nacio Herb Brown, Arthur Freed) – 4:28
 "And I Still Love You" (Pauline Rivelli, Ruth Roberts, Stanley Clayton) – 3:14
 "Bean's Place" (Buck Clayton, Bob Hammer) – 2:57
 "Here's That Rainy Day" (Johnny Burke, Jimmy Van Heusen) – 5:24
 "I Won't Dance" (Oscar Hammerstein II, Otto Harbach, Jerome Kern) – 3:22
 "Indian Summer" (Al Dubin, Victor Herbert) – 5:03
 "Out of Nowhere" (Johnny Green, Edward Heyman) – 3:41

Personnel
Coleman Hawkins — tenor saxophone
Bill Berry (tracks 1–3 & 7–10), Snooky Young (tracks 4–6, 11 & 12) — trumpet
Urbie Green — trombone
Barry Harris — piano
Buddy Catlett — double bass
Eddie Locke — drums

References

Impulse! Records albums
Coleman Hawkins albums
1965 albums
Albums produced by Bob Thiele
Albums recorded at Van Gelder Studio